Alfonso García González (19March 19092December 1961) was a Mexican politician. He was the last governor of the North Territory of Baja California and the first provisional governor of the State of Baja California.

Early life
Alfonso García González was born in Toluca, State of Mexico on 19 March 1909. He attended the National Autonomous University of Mexico, earning his law degree in 1931.

Governor of Baja California
García González was appointed governor of the North Territory of Baja California by president Miguel Alemán Valdés, taking office on 22 October 1947. The territory became a state on 16 January 1952 and García González served as provisional governor until 30 November 1953, when he was succeeded by Braulio Maldonado Sández.

Later political career
He later served as ambassador of Mexico to Colombia. In 1958, he became president of the Confederación Deportiva Mexicana and from 1959 to 1961 he headed the Mexican department of tourism.

See also
Governor of Baja California

References

1909 births
1961 deaths
Governors of Baja California
National Autonomous University of Mexico alumni
Politicians from Baja California
Politicians from the State of Mexico
20th-century Mexican politicians
People from Toluca